Nowa Obra  is a village in the administrative district of Gmina Wolsztyn, within Wolsztyn County, Greater Poland Voivodeship, in west-central Poland.

The village has a population of 3.

References

Nowa Obra